The 1886 Lafayette football team was an American football team that represented Lafayette College as an independent during the 1886 college football season. Playing without a regular coach, the team compiled a 10–2 record and outscored opponents by a total of 211 to 75.

Schedule

References

Lafayette
Lafayette Leopards football seasons
Lafayette football